The shieldhead gecko (Gonatodes caudiscutatus) is a species of lizard in the Sphaerodactylidae family native to Ecuador and Colombia.

References

Gonatodes
Reptiles described in 1859
Taxa named by Albert Günther